Meshea La'Shawn Poore is an American lawyer and politician from the state of West Virginia. A member of the Democratic Party, Poore served in the West Virginia House of Delegates, representing the 37th district.

Effective Feb. 19, 2018, Meshea Poore is the vice president of diversity, equity and inclusion at West Virginia University.

Biography
Poore is from Kanawha City, West Virginia. She graduated from Howard University with a bachelor's degree, and from the Southern University Law Center with her juris doctor. She worked as a public defender in Kanawha County, and then joined the Dooley Law Firm.

In 2008, Poore ran for election to the West Virginia House of Delegates, representing the 31st district. She lost the Democratic Party primary election to incumbent Carrie Webster by 117 votes. In 2009, Webster became a circuit judge, and Joe Manchin, the then-Governor of West Virginia, appointed Poore to the House of Delegates to serve the remainder of Webster's term. Poore was reelected in 2010 and 2012.

She was defeated by former Chairman of the West Virginia Democratic Party, Nick Casey.

References

Living people
Democratic Party members of the West Virginia House of Delegates
Lawyers from Charleston, West Virginia
Howard University alumni
Southern University Law Center alumni
West Virginia lawyers
African-American women lawyers
American women lawyers
African-American lawyers
1975 births
21st-century African-American people
21st-century African-American women
20th-century African-American people
20th-century African-American women
Politicians from Charleston, West Virginia